ESA École supérieure des affaires Business School is a Business School located in the district of Clemenceau, Beirut dedicated to the education and training of executives and managers from Lebanon and the Middle East. 

It benefits from the Association of MBAs accreditation, and obtained the Business Graduate Association (BGA) label.

ESA's academic partnerships have earned some of its programs international rankings:

 ESA’s EMBA, in joint degree with ESCP Business School, is ranked No. 6 worldwide by the Financial Times
 ESA’s BBA, offered as a joint degree with ESSEC BS, is:
 ranked No. 1 in France in the 2022 ranking of Bachelors in four years by the magazine "Challenges"
 ranked No. 1 of the best post-baccalaureate BBAs in business schools in the 2022 "L'Etudiant" Ranking

The School has nearly 550 students per year, as well as 510 students in Executive Education programs per year.

ESA Business School is managed by the Chamber of Commerce and Industry of Paris Ile-de-France Region and is a member of its network of 24 schools.

History 
The idea of creating a Business School in Beirut was initiated and promoted, in particular with the Paris Chamber of Commerce and Industry, by Professor Fayek Abillama, who was also President of the HEC Alumni Association in Lebanon.

At the beginning of 1995, Mr. Jean-Pierre LAFON, former Ambassador of France to Lebanon, convinced of the need to strengthen the French-Lebanese cooperation in the field of education and training, took up the project of creating a higher education establishment in management, close to the concerns of professional circles. In May 1995, he approached the Paris Chamber of Commerce and Industry to implement the project in close liaison with the Bank of Lebanon. A partnership was then set up between the French Ministry of Foreign Affairs, the Bank of Lebanon and the Chamber of Commerce and Industry of Paris.

ESA Business School was officially inaugurated on April 5, 1996, in the presence of the President of the French Republic Jacques Chirac and the Lebanese Prime Minister Rafic Hariri, by the signing of an intergovernmental agreement between France and Lebanon and an agreement between the Bank of Lebanon and the Paris Chamber of Commerce and Industry.

Campus 

Under the Ottoman Empire, from 1860, German missions set up in the Levant region and transform this site into an orphanage and a hospital, built and occupied by the deaconesses of Kaiserswerth who depended on the order of St John (Johanniterorden) of Jerusalem. 

They are pious women who live in community, and who care for the sick, assist prisoners, teach and deal with social problems. The house of the deaconesses of Beirut, located on what will later be the “Clemenceau site”, will be inaugurated on March 10, 1862. Saint John Hospital received between 9,000 and 12,000 patients per year, then approximately 14,000 patients from 1893, an average of 50 patients per day, from all religious communities. An English-speaking observer described it as the “first modern hospital”.

The hospital administration was provided by the Kuratorium, the local board of directors of the "Johanniterorden", which receives donations from Protestant circles in Europe and then the United States.

The deaconesses remained in the hospital from 1866 to 1918. For 52 years, they received and cared for a very large number of patients free of charge.

On the façade of the main building, one could even see the Grand Cross of the Order of Malta. Nearby stood the “Pastor’s Villa” which was, as its name suggests, occupied by the pastor of the order.

The Germans remained there until 1917, on the eve of the end of the First World War, when the French army of the Levant took possession of the premises.

In 1919, with the Treaty of Versailles and as war reparations, France obtained ownership of the site which became Maurice Rottier military hospital.

On the site also stood “Villa Rose”, a family home built in the 19th century by Fortuné and Nicolas Portalis, sons of Jean Etienne, wealthy owners of a silk factory in Btater. The Portalis heirs decided to sell this house to the French, after having sold the silk factory to the Lebanese in 1923. In 1943, when Lebanon became independent, the site changed radically as the French government decided to set up the headquarters of the French diplomatic chancellery and all of its services there. The residence of the Ambassadors is nevertheless established at the “Résidence des Pins”, as is still the case today.

When the Chancellery was set up, the geographical location of the Clemenceau site was ideal, but serious security events, foremost among which was the assassination of the French ambassador to Lebanon, Louis Delamare, in 1981, coupled with the permanent danger of being on a front line during the civil war, pushed the leaders to move the Embassy.

With the departure of the staff, desolation quickly seizes the site which became abandoned.

In 1995, when the idea of creating ESA Business School was born, the Clemenceau site bore the scars of 17 years of war. But the fact that France was its owner and that it enjoyed an exceptional location in the heart of Beirut tipped the scales for the installation of a major management school.

After the demining operations carried out by the military, rehabilitation work was launched by Jacques Chirac and Rafic Hariri who inaugurated the opening of the site on April 5, 1996.

Academics

Faculty 
The Ecole Supérieure des Affaires hosts approximately 250 visiting international leading academics and professors most of which come from the two centres of Business Higher Education of the Paris Chamber of Commerce and Industry: ESCP Business School and HEC group. The ESA is headed by Maxence Duault who had been the deputy director general of ESCP Business School; M. Duault replaced Stéphane Attali and assumed office in 2019. According to the WBS 2010 ranking, after 14 years of existence, the ESA scored first in the MENA region amongst more than 50 other establishments. Highly selective, the Ecole Supérieure des Affaires has today acquired a great prestige, competing French and English best business schools.

Academic cooperation 
 ESCP Europe (École supérieure de commerce de Paris–École européenne des affaires)
 Institut d'Administration des Entreprises at Poitiers
 École supérieure de commerce de Rouen
 HEC Lausanne
 Groupe HEC paris
 Paris Diderot University
 Reims Management School
 Università Commerciale Luigi Bocconi
 Universita Ca' Foscari Venezia
 Skema Business School
 Rotterdam School of Management

Admissions 
The selection criteria rest mainly on competitive written and oral exams.

References

Universities in Lebanon
Schools in Beirut
Beirut
1996 establishments in Lebanon
Educational institutions established in 1996